Bulbophyllum bonaccordense is a species of orchid native to India. This species was first formally named by C. Sathish Kumar in 1989 as Trias bonaccordensis. It was transferred to the genus Bulbophyllum in 2014.

References

bonaccordense
Flora of India (region)